Respiration may refer to:

Biology 
 Cellular respiration, the process in which  nutrients are converted into useful energy in a cell
 Anaerobic respiration, cellular respiration without oxygen 
 Maintenance respiration, the amount of cellular respiration required for an organism to  maintain itself in a constant state
 Respiration (physiology), transporting oxygen and carbon dioxide between cells and the external environment
 Respiratory system, the anatomical system of an organism used for respiration
 Breathing, passing air in and out through respiratory organs
 Aquatic respiration, animals extracting oxygen from water
 Artificial respiration, the act of simulating respiration, which provides for the overall exchange of gases in the body by pulmonary ventilation, external respiration and internal respiration
 Cheyne–Stokes respiration, an abnormal pattern of breathing characterized by progressively deeper and sometimes faster breathing, followed by a gradual decrease that results in a temporary stop in breathing called an apnea
 Respiration, a journal by Karger Publishers

Ecology 
 Carbon respiration, a concept used in calculating carbon (as ) flux occurring in the atmosphere
 Ecosystem respiration, measurement of gross carbon dioxide production by all organisms in an ecosystem
 Root respiration, exchange of gases between plant roots and the atmosphere
 Photorespiration, enzymatic combination of RuBP with oxygen

Entertainment 
 "Respiration" (song), a 1999 single by Black Star 
 "Respire" (song), a 2003 song by Mickey 3D
 Respire (film), a 2014 French drama film
 Respiration (album), a 2022 album by Cecil Taylor